Saskia Reeves (born 16 August 1961) is an English actress, best known for her roles in the films Close My Eyes (1991) and I.D. (1995), the 2000 miniseries Frank Herbert's Dune and the 2016 film Our Kind of Traitor.

Early life
Saskia Reeves was born 16 August 1961, and brought up in Twickenham and Paddington, London with her younger sister Imogen, by her Dutch mother and English father. Reeves attended the Lady Eleanor Holles School in Hampton and then studied at London's Guildhall School of Music and Drama.

Career
Early in her career she performed in puppet shows and in satirical revues at the Covent Garden Community Theatre.

Her television credits include Spooks, The Commander and the Bodies finale. Her stage work includes productions at London's National and Royal Court theatres as well as on international tour. 

In addition to her acting career, Reeves does voice work, including commercials, narration, and book readings.

In 2008, she starred in English Touring Theatre's revival of Athol Fugard's Hello and Goodbye at the Trafalgar Studios in London.

In 2010, she starred as Anne Darwin, the wife of John Darwin, in BBC4's Canoe Man, a dramatisation of the John Darwin disappearance case, and co-starred in the BBC1 series Luther.

In 2011, Reeves played the matriarch, Anna Brangwen, in the first part of William Ivory's two-part adaptation of D. H. Lawrence's novels The Rainbow and Women in Love, first shown on BBC4. She also had a major role in the 2016 Midsomer Murders episode “A Dying Art.”

Filmography

Film

Television

References

External links

1961 births
Audiobook narrators
English people of Dutch descent
English film actresses
English radio actresses
English stage actresses
English television actresses
English voice actresses
Living people
Royal Shakespeare Company members
English Shakespearean actresses
Alumni of the Guildhall School of Music and Drama
People educated at Lady Eleanor Holles School
20th-century English actresses
21st-century English actresses
People from Paddington
Actresses from London